Crepis vesicaria is a European species of flowering plant in the family Asteraceae with the common name beaked hawk's-beard. It is native to the Western and Southern Europe from Ireland and Portugal east as far as Germany, Austria, and Greece. It became naturalized in scattered locations in North America.

Crepis vesicaria  is an annual, biennial, or perennial herb up to 120 cm (48 inches or 4 feet) tall, producing a large underground caudex. Each plant can have as many as 20 flower heads, each with up to 70 ray florets but no disc florets. It grows on hillsides and in sandy clearings.

A prominent plant, Crepis vesicaria stands erect, with many  branches, each ending in its own dandelion-like flower.

The underside of the flower has two layers of leaf-like phyllaries. The inner layer is longer and pointed, and often curls back away from the rest of the flower head. The outer layer is substantially shorter.

Subspecies
Subspecies include:
 Crepis vesicaria subsp. andryaloides (Lowe) Babc.
 Crepis vesicaria subsp. bivonana (Soldano & F.Conti) Giardina & Raimondo 
 Crepis vesicaria subsp. hyemalis (Biv.) Babc.
 Crepis vesicaria subsp. myriocephala (Batt.) Babc. 
 Crepis vesicaria subsp. stellata (Ball) Babc.
 Crepis vesicaria subsp. taraxacifolia (Thuill.) Thell.
 Crepis vesicaria subsp.  vesicaria

References

vesicaria
Flora of Europe
Plants described in 1753
Taxa named by Carl Linnaeus